Special AT-rich sequence-binding protein 2 (SATB2) also known as DNA-binding protein SATB2 is a protein that in humans is encoded by the SATB2 gene. SATB2 is a DNA-binding protein that specifically binds nuclear matrix attachment regions and is involved in transcriptional regulation and chromatin remodeling.  SATB2 shows a restricted mode of expression  and is expressed in certain cell nuclei . The SATB2 protein is mainly expressed in the epithelial cells of the colon and rectum, followed by the nuclei of neurons in the brain.

Function 

With an average worldwide prevalence of 1/800 live births, oral clefts are one of the most common birth defects. Although over 300 malformation syndromes can include an oral cleft, non-syndromic forms represent about 70% of cases with cleft lip with or without cleft palate (CL/P) and roughly 50% of cases with cleft palate (CP) only. Non-syndromic oral clefts are considered ‘complex’ or ‘multifactorial’ in that both genes and environmental factors contribute to the etiology. Current research suggests that several genes are likely to control risk, as well as environmental factors such as maternal smoking.

Re-sequencing studies to identify specific mutations suggest several different genes may control risk to oral clefts, and many distinct variants or mutations in apparently causal genes have been found reflecting a high degree of allelic heterogeneity. Although most of these mutations are extremely rare and often show incomplete penetrance (i.e., an unaffected parent or other relative may also carry the mutation), combined they may account for up to 5% of non-syndromic oral cleft.

Mutations in the SATB2 gene have been found to cause isolated cleft palates. SATB2 also likely influences brain development. This is consistent with mouse studies that show SATB2 is necessary for proper establishment of cortical neuron connections across the corpus callosum, despite the apparently normal corpus callosum in heterozygous knockout mice.

Structure 

SATB2 is a 733 amino-acid homeodomain-containing human protein with a molecular weight of 82.5 kDa encoded by the SATB2 gene on 2q33. The protein contains two degenerate homeodomain regions known as CUT domains (amino acid 352–437 and 482–560) and a classical homeodomain (amino acid 614–677). There is an extraordinarily high degree of sequence conservation, with only three predicted amino-acid substitutions in the 733 residue protein with I481V, A590T and I730T being amino acid differences between the human and the mouse protein.

Clinical significance 

SATB2 has been implicated as causative in the cleft or high palate of individuals with 2q32q33 microdeletion syndrome.

SATB2 was found to be disrupted in two unrelated cases with de novo apparently balanced chromosome translocations associated with cleft palate and Pierre Robin sequence.

The role of SATB2 in tooth and jaw development is supported by the identification of a de novo SATB2 mutation in a male with profound intellectual disabilities and jaw and tooth abnormalities and a translocation interrupting SATB2 in an individual with Robin sequence. In addition, mouse models have demonstrated haploinsufficiency of SATB2 results in craniofacial defects that phenocopy those caused by 2q32q33 deletion in humans; moreover, full functional loss of SATB2 amplifies these defects.

SATB2 expression is highly specific for cancer in the lower GI-tract and has been implicated as a cancer biomarker for colorectal cancer.

References

Further reading

External links 
 
 
Registry of SATB2 cases http://satb2gene.com

Transcription factors